Susie O'Carroll is a camogie player. She has won an All Ireland Junior Camogie Championship with Kildare in 2013 as well as an All Ireland Junior A Camogie Title (Nancy Murray Cup ) in 2010. She was also part of Kildare's victorious National League Division 2 team in 2004.
Susie has won Soaring Star awards in 2009, 2012 and 2013. She was the 2009 & 2013 Kildare camogie player of the year award winner. 
She captained UCD to the Ashbourne Cup in 2008 and was named the Player of the Tournament. With a total of 1-24 she was the highest scoring player in the Kay Mills Cup of 2011.
Susie was also the top scorer in the 2013 All-Ireland Junior Camogie Championship.

Career
In 2004 Susie o’carroll two goals in opening 20 minutes of Kildare's National Camogie League second division victory over Laois.

Susie was captain of the victorious UCD team in the 2008 Ashbourne Cup. She also starred in the 2007 decider as UCD won their first title in 19 years.
Susie was part of the Kildare team that lost the 2013 National Camogie League Division 2 final to Limerick. Later that year Susie scored a brace of goals in a two-minute salvo that helped Kildare on the way to the 2013 All Ireland Junior Camogie title. She finished the game with a tally of 2-2. In 2015, O'Carroll captained Kildare to the 2015 All Ireland Intermediate Final where they lost to Waterford.

References

External links 
 Official Camogie Website
 of 2009 championship in On The Ball Official Camogie Magazine
 feature on Susie O'Carroll in the irish Times 21 November 2009
 2009 Kildare Camogie championship final report in Kildare Nationalist
 2007" UCD land Ashbourne Cup for first time in 19 years from the irish Times
 Ashbourne Cup semi-final 2008 from the irish Times

Living people
People from Celbridge
Kildare camogie players
Year of birth missing (living people)
UCD camogie players